Let It Flow is a solo album by rock musician Elvin Bishop, released in 1974. The album was recorded at Capricorn Studios in Macon, Georgia, several years after he left The Butterfield Blues Band. Guest musicians include Charlie Daniels, Dickey Betts, Toy Caldwell, Vassar Clements, and Sly Stone.

The album peaked at No. 100 on the Billboard 200.

Critical reception
AllMusic wrote that "Bishop was able to emphasize the country/blues aspects of his persona and his music in the move from Marin County, California, to Macon, Georgia." The Rolling Stone Album Guide called the album "almost too laid-back for its own good."

Track listing

All songs written by Elvin Bishop except where noted.

"Sunshine Special" – 3:40
"Ground Hog" – 3:30 
"Honey Babe" – 3:20  
"Stealin' Watermelons" – 4:02 
"Travelin' Shoes" – 7:10 
"Let It Flow" – 3:52  
"Hey Good Lookin'"  (Hank Williams) – 3:43
"Fishin'" – 4:26 
"Can't Go Back" – 3:27 
"I Can't Hold Myself in Line" (Merle Haggard) – 2:39 
"Bourbon Street" – 2:16

Personnel

Elvin Bishop – electric guitar, acoustic guitar, slide guitar, lead vocals
Johnny Sandlin – acoustic guitar, electric guitar, percussion, tambourine
John Vernazza – acoustic guitar, electric guitar, slide guitar, background vocals
Charlie Daniels – fiddle, acoustic guitar, washboard, background vocals
Philip Aaberg – piano, keyboards, clavinet
Donny Baldwin – drums, background vocals
Dickey Betts – electric guitar
Toy Caldwell – steel guitar
Michael "Fly" Brooks – bass guitar
Paul Hornsby – organ, keyboards
Sly Stone – organ, keyboards
Vassar Clements – strings
Stephen Miller – piano
Randall Bramblett – saxophone
Dave Brown – saxophone
Harold Williams – saxophone
Billy Meeker – drums
Jo Baker – percussion, background vocals
Debbie Cathey – background vocals
Gideon Daniels – background vocals
Jerome Joseph – conga, conductor
Annie Sampson – background vocals
Mickey Thomas – background vocals
David Walshaw – percussion, tambourine
Johnny Sandlin – producer
Sam Whiteside – recording engineer

References

Elvin Bishop albums
Capricorn Records albums
1974 albums